Jonathan Malu Kazadi-Muyombu, (born June 24, 1989) is a Swiss professional basketball player.

He has been a member of the Switzerland national basketball team on several occasions. At the EuroBasket 2017 qualification, he led the Swiss team in assists and offensive rebounds.

References

External links
scout BASKETBALL Profile
Eurobasket.com Profile
REAL GM Profile

1989 births
Living people
BBC Monthey players
Fribourg Olympic players
Orléans Loiret Basket players
Science City Jena players
Shooting guards
Sportspeople from Bern
Swiss expatriate basketball people in France
Swiss men's basketball players
Swiss people of Democratic Republic of the Congo descent